The qualification process of men's teams for the 2005 Rugby World Cup Sevens. Automatic qualification was extended to the host and the eight quarterfinalists of the previous World Cup. The remaining spots were contested in each of the six regions' respective tournaments.

Qualified teams

Africa
From 25−26 September 2004, there were two tournaments for the North and South zones, with the champions of each qualifying.

North
{| class="wikitable" style="text-align: center;"
|-
!width="100"|Teams
!width="40"|Pld
!width="40"|W
!width="40"|D
!width="40"|L
!width="40"|PF
!width="40"|PA
!width="40"|+/−
!width="40"|Pts
|-bgcolor=ccffcc
|align=left|
|5||5||0||0||173||5||+168||15
|-
|align=left|
|5||4||0||1||102||53||+49||13
|-
|align=left|
|5||3||0||2||94||65||+29||11
|-
|align=left|
|5||2||0||3||90||74||+16||9
|-
|align=left|
|5||1||0||4||48||154||−106||7
|-
|align=left|
|5||0||0||5||5||161||−156||5
|}

South

Pool A
{| class="wikitable" style="text-align: center;"
|-
!width="120"|Teams
!width="40"|Pld
!width="40"|W
!width="40"|D
!width="40"|L
!width="40"|PF
!width="40"|PA
!width="40"|+/−
!width="40"|Pts
|-bgcolor=ccccff
|align=left|
|3||3||0||0||65||5||+60||9
|-bgcolor=ccccff
|align=left|
|3||2||0||1||50||43||+7||7
|-
|align=left|
|3||1||0||2||52||38||+14||5
|-
|align=left|
|3||0||0||3||7||88||−81||3
|}

Pool B
{| class="wikitable" style="text-align: center;"
|-
!width="120"|Teams
!width="40"|Pld
!width="40"|W
!width="40"|D
!width="40"|L
!width="40"|PF
!width="40"|PA
!width="40"|+/−
!width="40"|Pts
|-bgcolor=ccccff
|align=left|
|3||3||0||0||60||34||+26||9
|-bgcolor=ccccff
|align=left|
|3||1||1||1||55||24||+31||6
|-
|align=left|
|3||1||1||1||40||24||+16||6
|-
|align=left|
|3||0||0||3||19||92||−73||3
|}

Finals

North America and the West Indies
Ten teams competed in the 2004 NAWIRA Sevens for a spot in the World Cup.

Pool A
{| class="wikitable" style="text-align: center;"
|-
!width="200"|Teams
!width="40"|Pld
!width="40"|W
!width="40"|D
!width="40"|L
!width="40"|PF
!width="40"|PA
!width="40"|+/−
!width="40"|Pts
|-bgcolor=ccffcc
|align=left|
|4||4||0||0||169||7||+162||12
|-bgcolor=ccffcc
|align=left|
|4||2||1||1||70||36||+34||9
|-bgcolor=ccccff
|align=left|
|4||2||1||1||48||44||+4||9
|-bgcolor=ccccff
|align=left|
|4||1||0||3||12||86||−74||6
|-
|align=left|
|4||0||0||4||10||136||−126||4
|}

Pool B
{| class="wikitable" style="text-align: center;"
|-
!width="200"|Teams
!width="40"|Pld
!width="40"|W
!width="40"|D
!width="40"|L
!width="40"|PF
!width="40"|PA
!width="40"|+/−
!width="40"|Pts
|-bgcolor=ccffcc
|align=left|
|4||3||1||0||99||14||+85||11
|-bgcolor=ccffcc
|align=left|
|4||3||1||0||119||35||+84||11
|-bgcolor=ccccff
|align=left|
|4||2||0||2||87||36||+51||8
|-bgcolor=ccccff
|align=left|
|4||1||0||3||29||142||−113||6
|-
|align=left|
|4||0||0||4||26||133||−107||4
|}

Shield

Plate
{{Round4-with third|RD2=Plate|Consol=Bowl

|||27||7
|||7||22|||15||29|||7||21}}

Cup

South America
On 24–25 January 2004, seven nations took part in the CONSUR Sevens tournament to determine the one spot for the World Cup.

Pool A
{| class="wikitable" style="text-align: center;"
|-
!width="100"|Teams
!width="40"|Pld
!width="40"|W
!width="40"|D
!width="40"|L
!width="40"|PF
!width="40"|PA
!width="40"|+/−
!width="40"|Pts
|-bgcolor=ccffcc
|align=left|
|3||3||0||0||65||14||+51||9|-bgcolor=ccffcc
|align=left|
|3||1||1||1||77||52||+25||6|-bgcolor=ccccff
|align=left|
|3||1||1||1||50||55||−5||6|-
|align=left|
|3||0||0||3||14||85||−71||3|}

Pool B
{| class="wikitable" style="text-align: center;"
|-
!width="100"|Teams
!width="40"|Pld
!width="40"|W
!width="40"|D
!width="40"|L
!width="40"|PF
!width="40"|PA
!width="40"|+/−
!width="40"|Pts
|-bgcolor=ccffcc
|align=left|
|2||2||0||0||55||5||+50||6|-bgcolor=ccffcc
|align=left|
|2||1||0||1||48||17||+31||4|-bgcolor=ccccff
|align=left|
|2||0||0||2||0||81||−81||2'''
|}

Knockout round

Fifth Place

Plate

Asia

From 10–11 September 2004, twelve teams competed in Sri Lanka for three spots in the World Cup.

Europe

From 16−17 July 2004, sixteen teams participated in the FIRA-AER European Sevens, where seven of the top placing teams qualified.

Oceania
In the 6–7 February Wellington Sevens of the 2003–04 World Sevens Series, Cook Islands, Niue, Papua New Guinea and Tonga contested the one remaining Oceania qualifying slot by placing the highest of the four. Tonga won by placing in the Plate Final.

References

Rugby World Cup Sevens qualification
World Cup Qualifier Sevens